Wali-e-Mewat Raja Khanzada Bahadur Khan was the Khanzada Meo Rajput ruler of Mewat. He succeeded as Wali-e-Mewat after the death of his father Raja Nahar Khan Mewati in 1402.

Coronation 
His coronation took place at Alwar in 1402, where his brothers proclaimed him as Wali-e-Mewat and swore their allegiance with him as their liege lord. He then made Alwar his capital. In honour of his ascension to the throne, he had a mosque built at Alwar known as Jamia-i-Alwar Masjid.

Later life 
He founded Bahadurpur in 1406. In 1412 he handed-over the throne of Mewat to his son Raja Akleem Khan and devoted himself to religious work until his death.

References 

 

Mewat
Indian Muslims
Year of birth unknown